Catahoula is a census-designated place in St. Martin Parish, Louisiana, United States. It is located outside the western boundary of the Atchafalaya River Basin, south of the town of Henderson. In 2019, its population was estimated at 1,054.

Demographics 

The racial and ethnic makeup of the census-designated place was 99.1% non-Hispanic white, and 0.9% Asian. The median age was 38.4, and 19.7% spoke another language other than English at home. The median household income was $52,417 and 11.5% of the population lived at or below the poverty line.

References

Unincorporated communities in St. Martin Parish, Louisiana
Unincorporated communities in Louisiana
Census-designated places in Lafayette metropolitan area, Louisiana